Saad Soleit  is an Egyptian football midfielder who played for Egypt in the 1980 African Cup of Nations.

External links
11v11 Profile

Egyptian footballers
Egypt international footballers
1980 African Cup of Nations players
Association football midfielders

Possibly living people
Year of birth missing